Major-General John McNeill Walter  (10 June 1861 – 1951) was a British Indian Army officer.

Military career
Educated at Cheltenham College, Walter was commissioned into the 12th Regiment of Foot on 14 January 1880. He became Deputy Assistant Adjutant-General in India in May 1896, and saw action with the Tochi Field Force and then at the Relief of Ladysmith in October 1899 during the Second Boer War. He became Assistant Adjutant-General in October 1910 and Deputy Adjutant-General at GHQ India in September 1913.

Walter served in World War I as Adjutant-General, India from November 1915 and as Major General in charge of Administration at Northern Command, India from 1917 before retiring at the end of the War.

References

1861 births
1951 deaths
British military personnel of the Second Boer War
Indian Army generals of World War I
British Indian Army generals
Companions of the Order of the Bath
Companions of the Order of the Star of India
Companions of the Distinguished Service Order
People educated at Cheltenham College